Brian Gurirab (born 28 October 1984) is a Namibian former footballer who played as a midfielder.

References

1984 births
Living people
Namibian men's footballers
Namibia international footballers
Chief Santos players
F.C. Civics Windhoek players
Estrela Clube Primeiro de Maio players
Orlando Pirates S.C. players
Association football midfielders
Namibian expatriate footballers
Expatriate footballers in Angola
Namibian expatriate sportspeople in Angola
People from Kunene Region